Deh Now-e Behzadi (also Romanized as Deh Now-e Behzādī; also known as Deh-e Now and Dehnow) is a village in Borj-e Akram Rural District, in the Central District of Fahraj County, Kerman Province, Iran. At the 2006 census, its population was 1,167, in 277 families.

References 

Populated places in Fahraj County